Carelia was a genus of small, air-breathing, land snails, terrestrial pulmonate gastropod mollusks in the family Amastridae and superfamily Cochlicopoidea. Snails in this genus were endemic to the Hawaiian Islands.

Species
Species within the genus Carelia include:

 Carelia anceophila
 Carelia bicolor
 Carelia cochlea
 Carelia cumingiana
 Carelia dolei
 Carelia evelynae
 Carelia glossema
 Carelia hyattiana
 Carelia kalalauensis
 Carelia knudseni
 Carelia lirata
 Carelia lymani
 Carelia mirabilis
 Carelia necra
 Carelia olivacea
 Carelia paradoxa
 Carelia periscelis
 Carelia pilsbryi
 Carelia sinclairi
 Carelia tenebrosa
 Carelia turricula

References

 ARKive info here: 

 
Amastridae
Extinct gastropods